Disability justice is a social justice movement which focuses on examining disability and ableism as they relate to other forms of oppression and identity such as race, class and gender. It was developed in 2005 by the Disability Justice Collective, a group including Patty Berne, Mia Mingus, Stacey Milbern, Leroy F. Moore Jr., and Eli Clare. In disability justice, disability is not considered to be defined in "white terms, or male terms, or straight terms." The movement also believes that ableism makes other forms of prejudice possible and that systems of oppression are intertwined. The disability justice framework is being applied to a intersectional reexamination of a wide range of disability, human rights, and justice movements.

Origins
Initially conceived by queer, disabled women of color, Patty Berne, Mia Mingus, and Stacey Milbern, in the San Francisco Bay Area, disability justice was built in reaction to their exclusion from mainstream disability rights movement and disability studies discourse and activism, as well as the ableism in activist spaces. They were later joined by Leroy Moore, Eli Clare, and Sebastian Margaret. Disability justice centers "disabled people of color, immigrants with disabilities, queers with disabilities, trans and gender non-conforming people with disabilities, people with disabilities who are houseless, people with disabilities who are incarcerated, people with disabilities who have had their ancestral lands stolen, amongst others."

As mentioned before, disability justice movements discuss the various systems of oppression even within the disability community. One specific example for the Asian American community would be how oftentimes, members are unable and refuse to get help for mental health because it is seen as "taboo" in their culture. Since mental health is an "untouchable" topic in Asian culture, members who struggle with it hide it due to shame and embarrassment, and therefore are not able to share their experiences with their community and society in general. This reflects how the identities of being an Asian American and also possessing a mental disability cause these members to have a "lesser" voice in society. The disability justice movement seeks to spread awareness on how ableism is much more complex than people struggling with a disability [ies]. 

Sins Invalid, the group through which the founders were connected, defines disability justice through ten key principles: intersectionality, leadership by those most affected, anti-capitalism, solidarity across different activist causes and movements, recognizing people as whole people, sustainability, solidarity across different disabilities, interdependence, collective access, and collective liberation.

The disability justice work of the Bay area activists has informed the development of the Disability Justice Initiative in Washington, D.C. On July 26, 2018, the 28th anniversary of the Americans With Disabilities Act (ADA), the Center for American Progress (CAP) formally announced its Disability Justice Initiative, under the direction of Rebecca Cokley. CAP is the first public policy think tank to specifically focus on disability.  Recognition of the need for an intentional and intersectional approach was driven in part by attempts to cut the Affordable Care Act.

In April 2019, Performance Space New York hosted a three-day festival developed around the disability justice framework. Performance Space New York worked with the political arts group Arika, the Whitney Museum of American Art and others to bring together disabled artists and writers. Entitled I wanna be with you everywhere (IWBWYE), the festival attempted to create an experience of "access intimacy", in which needs were "respected, anticipated, and lovingly welcomed".

Critiques of Disability Rights 
Like earlier critiques of reproductive rights by reproductive justice activists and critiques of environmentalism by environmental justice activists, the founders of the disability justice movement thought the disability rights movement and disability studies overly focused on straight white men with physical disabilities to the exclusion of others. 

Many in the disability justice movement were also critical of an emphasis on rights without a broader examination of systems of oppression (for example, the right to an education does not mean that all education is equitable).

Writer and activist Audre Lorde is frequently referenced as inspirational to the disability justice movement, for works such as her essay "A Burst of Light: Living with Cancer", which addresses disability, illness, and racial justice, emphasizing that "We do not live single issue lives". Writers such as Catherine Jampel have emphasized the importance of disability justice to an intersectional reexamination of environmental justice.
Writers such as Jina B. Kim draw upon disability justice and "crip-of-color" critiques in an attempt to develop an intersectional critical disability methodology which emphasizes that all lives are "enriched, enabled, and made possible" through a variety of means of support.

Further reading 

 Bartlett, Jennifer, Sheila Black, and Michael Northen. 2011. Beauty is a verb: the new poetry of disability. 
 Ben-Moshe, Liat, Chris Chapman, and Allison C. Carey. 2014. Disability Incarcerated. New York: Palgrave Macmillan US. 
 Block, Pamela, Devva Kasnitz, Akemi Nishida, and Nick Pollard. 2016. Occupying Disability: Critical Approaches to Community, Justice, and Decolonizing Disability. Dordrecht: Springer Netherlands. .
 Brown, Lydia X. Z., E. Ashkenazy, and Morénike Giwa Onaiwu. 2017. All the weight of our dreams: on living racialized autism. 
 Clare, Eli. 2015. Exile and pride: disability, queerness, and liberation. 
 Kafer, Alison. 2013. Feminist, queer, crip. Bloomington: Indiana University Press. 
 Khakpour, Porochista. 2018. Sick: a memoir. 
 Levins Morales, Aurora. 2019. Medicine stories: essays for radicals. 
 Lewis, Talia A. Disability Justice In the Age of Mass Incarceration: Perspectives on Race, Disability, Law & Accountability, Northeastern University School of Law, Public Interest Law Syllabus, Summer 2016. goo.gl/uwGIB0. Course Archive: #DisabilityJusticeNUSL.
 Moore, Leroy F. Jr. 2017. Black disabled art history 101. San Francisco, CA: Xochitl Justice Press. 
 Onazi, Oche. 2020. An African Path to Disability Justice Community, Relationships and Obligations. .
 Patterson, Jennifer, and Tourmaline. 2016. Queering sexual violence: radical voices from within the anti-violence movement. 
 Piepzna-Samarasinha, Leah Lakshmi. 2018. Care work: dreaming disability justice.
 Lorde, Audre. 2007. The cancer journals. San Francisco, CA: Aunt Lute Books. 
 Luczak, Raymond. 2015. QDA: a queer disability anthology. 
 Roberts, Dorothy E. 1997. Killing the Black Body: Race, Reproduction, and the Meaning of Liberty.
 Schalk, Sami. 2018. Bodyminds reimagined : (dis)ability, race, and gender in black women's speculative fiction. 
 Sicolo, Paola Silvana, and Alejandra Marchevsky. 2019. Enabling Disability Justice: Toward A Transformation of Latin American Studies. 
 Sins Invalid (Organization). 2019. Skin, tooth, and bone: the basis of movement is our people : a disability justice primer. 
 Washington, Harriet A. 2010. Medical Apartheid The Dark History of Medical Experimentation on Black Americans from Colonial Times to the Present. Paw Prints. 
 Wong, Alice. 2018. Resistance and hope: essays by disabled people.

External links

 
 
 Project LETS Resource list for Disability Justice

References 

Disability rights
Activism